Hindoli is a small town in the Bundi district of Rajasthan, India. Situated in the lap of the Arawalli Hills, the town is a trade center for many small villages.

Police Station of Hindoli is honored as "Adarsh Police Thana" for maintaining low crime rate, high peace and providing quick response.

History 
Hindoli has a temple of Hindu lord Shiva which was made up by Pandava
Harana around 4 km away from Hindoli is birthplace of great Hindi poet Suryamal Mishrana

Geography 
Hindoli is on National Highway Number 52.
Hindoli is surrounded by small hills.

Connectivity 

It is directly connected to Jaipur - the capital of Rajasthan.
Hindoli is 190 km from Jaipur and 65 km from Kota - a district in Rajasthan that is famous for its industries and coaching institutes.

Tourist places 
You can have a tour to Hindoli to the following places:
A big lake - Ramsagar lake in Hindoli, that is surrounded by hills and trees
An old fort that speaks glorious history of Hindoli
Triveni Chowk - 3 old Hindu Temples built in Hindu temple architecture facing a pole at center
Paal Bhagh - A garden on the banks of Ramsagar lake
BarahDwari - A small auditorium having 12 gates in Paal Bhagh garden
 Bijasan Mata Mandir(on the hill)

Places of interest 
 Haweli and birthplace of Suryamal Mishrana
 Sahaspuriya MAHLA Fort of Hada's Brothers Kharodiya Raoraja (5 km from Hindoli) one of the oldest forts of Rajputana
 Cheelghati Balaji temple which is situated on a big mountain
 Historical Veer Tejaji temple
 Shiv temple (made by Pandva's) it have an interesting tale
 Historacal Bokreshwar Mahadev, Devnarayan bhagwan and Veer tejaji temple at village NEGARH of hindoli tehsil
imali wale dev [bks]
 Ganesh ji ki bavdi
 Pilot Stadium

Educational Institutes 
 Govt Higher Secondary School
 Aadarsh vidhya mandir
 APS college
 Ebenezer public school
 Swami Vivekanand Government Model School (CBSE)
 Sekhawati public school.
 Sunrise Academy
 Govt. College Hindoli
 Govt agriculture college

Politics 
Hindoli is a constituency of Rajasthan.

Hindoli is an important state constituency in Rajasthan for all the political parties.

Main players in Hindoli are Congress(I) and BJP (Bharthiya Janata Party).
Political parties always try to get vote using some calculations of castes.
Gurjjar and Saini (Mali)castes contribute as more than 60% of total votes.

 Member of Parliament (MP)                  : Mr.Subhash Baheria (BJP)
 Member of Lagisleture Assembly (MLA)     : Mr. Ashok Chandna(Congress) 

Villages in Bundi district